Justice Knox may refer to:

Adrian Knox (1863–1932), second Chief Justice of Australia
John C. Knox (Pennsylvania judge) (1817–1880), associate justice of the Pennsylvania Supreme Court
John Leonard Knox (1925–2015), British High Court judge, sitting in the Chancery division
Robert C. Knox (1892–1947), justice of the Arkansas Supreme Court

See also
Judge Knox (disambiguation)